Ignatius Cadette, born 3 March 1957 in Castries, St Lucia, is a former West Indian cricketer who played first-class and List A cricket for Windward Islands and the Combined Islands cricket team in the 1970s and 1980s as a batsman and wicketkeeper.

References

1957 births
Saint Lucian cricketers
Living people
Combined Islands cricketers
Windward Islands cricketers
Wicket-keepers